Sri Lanka competed at the 2020 Summer Paralympics in Tokyo, Japan, from 24 August to 5 September 2021.

Sri Lanka's team consisted of 9 athletes (8 men and 1 woman) competing in four sports.

Dinesh Priyantha Herath clinched an historic gold medal in the men's javelin throw F46 category with a new world record of 67.79 m. He claimed Sri Lanka's first ever Paralympic gold medal and also secured Sri Lanka's first medal at the 2020 Tokyo Paralympics. Herath also served as the country's flagbearer during the opening ceremony.

Competitors
The following is the list of athletes per sport/discipline.

Medalists

Archery 

Sri Lanka has entered one archer at Men's Individual Recurve Open.

Athletics 

Sri Lanka qualified six athletes (five men and one woman).

Track events

Field events

Rowing

Sri Lanka qualified one boat in the men's single sculls events for the games by winning the gold medal at the 2021 FISA Asian & Oceanian Qualification Regatta in Tokyo, Japan. This will mark the country's sport debut at the Paralympics.

Qualification Legend: FA=Final A (medal); FB=Final B (non-medal); R=Repechage

Wheelchair tennis

Sri Lanka qualified one player entry for wheelchair tennis. Suresh Dharmasena qualified under the bipartite commission invitation allocation quota.

See also
Sri Lanka at the 2018 Asian Para Games
Sri Lanka at the 2020 Summer Olympics
Sri Lanka at the Paralympics

References 

2020
Nations at the 2020 Summer Paralympics
2021 in Sri Lankan sport